Blues for Lady Day (subtitled A Personal Tribute to Billie Holiday) is an album by American jazz pianist Mal Waldron featuring performances recorded in Baarn, Holland in 1972 and released on the Freedom label.  The album was rereleased on CD on Black Lion Records in 1994 combined with tracks from A Little Bit of Miles.

Reception 
The Allmusic review by Scott Yanow awarded the album 4½ stars stating "the emphasis is on thoughtful (and sometimes a bit downbeat) interpretations at ballad tempoes".

Track listing
 "Blues for Lady Day" (Mal Waldron) — 3:43
 "Just Friends" (John Klenner, Sam M. Lewis) — 4:04
 "Don't Blame Me" (Jimmy McHugh, Dorothy Fields) — 3:20
 "You Don't Know What Love Is" (Gene de Paul, Don Raye) — 5:38
 "The Man I Love" (George Gershwin, Ira Gershwin) — 3:01
 "You're My Thrill" (Jay Gorney, Sidney Clare) — 3:39
 "Strange Fruit" (Abel Meeropol) — 2:47
 "Easy Living" (Ralph Rainger, Leo Robin) — 4:48
 "Mean to Me" (Fred E. Ahlert, Roy Turk) — 3:01
Recorded  in Baarn, Holland on February 5, 1972.

Personnel 
 Mal Waldron – piano

References 

Freedom Records albums
Mal Waldron albums
1973 albums
Billie Holiday tribute albums
Solo piano jazz albums